Arthur McAleenan (October 15, 1894 – May 15, 1920) was an American diver. He competed in three events at the 1912 Summer Olympics.

McAleenan died at Roosevelt Hospital on May 15, 1920, from injuries he suffered in a car accident on Long Island.

References

External links
 

1894 births
1920 deaths
American male divers
Olympic divers of the United States
Divers at the 1912 Summer Olympics
Sportspeople from New York City
Road incident deaths in New York City